Joel Lehtonen (27 November 1881 – 20 November 1934) was a Finnish author, translator, critic and journalist. He was born in Sääminki (now part of Savonlinna). His childhood was fatherless and poverty-stricken, his mother suffered from mental frailties and Joel himself was forced into paupery. Joel's foster mother supported his schooling and Lehtonen was able to study literature for a few years in the University of Helsinki, but dropped out without completing a degree.

As an author, he began as a neoromanticist, but after the Finnish Civil War his outlook transformed into deep pessimism and disenchanted scepticism.

Having suffered for years from various ailments, he committed suicide by hanging himself with a rope, that had been used to wrap up a parcel of books, in November 1934.

Bibliography
Paholaisen viulu (1904)
Perm (1904)
Mataleena (1905)
Villi (1905)
Tarulinna : Suomen kansan satuja Suomen lapsille (1906) 
Myrtti ja alppiruusu (1911) 
Rakkaita muistoja (1911) 
Punainen mylly (1913)
Kerran kesällä (1917)
Kuolleet omenapuut (1918)
Putkinotkon metsäläiset (1919)
Putkinotkon herrastelijat (1920)
Rakastunut rampa eli Sakris Kukkelman, köyhä polseviikki
Sorron lapset (1923)
Punainen mies (1925)
Lintukoto (1929)
Hyvästijättö lintukodolle, (1934)

References

External links 
 

1881 births
1934 suicides
People from Savonlinna
People from Mikkeli Province (Grand Duchy of Finland)
Writers from South Savo
Finnish male short story writers
Finnish short story writers
Finnish translators
Finnish critics
20th-century Finnish novelists
20th-century translators
Suicides by hanging in Finland
20th-century short story writers
20th-century male writers
20th-century Finnish journalists
1934 deaths